James Alexander Young (born July 8, 1950) is a former American football defensive end who played two seasons with the Houston Oilers of the National Football League. He played college football at Texas Southern University and attended Wheatley High School in Houston, Texas.

References

External links
Just Sports Stats

Living people
1950 births
Players of American football from Houston
American football defensive ends
Texas Southern Tigers football players
Houston Oilers players